Victor Norman Hambridge (5 October 1886 – 22 June 1981) was an Australian rules footballer who played with Collingwood in the Victorian Football League (VFL).

Notes

External links 

Vic Hambridge's profile at Collingwood Forever

1886 births
1981 deaths
Australian rules footballers from Melbourne
Collingwood Football Club players
People from Kensington, Victoria